Hans Moser (30 September 1944 – 2 July 2016) was prominent as a pornographic-film director and producer, photographer and magazine publisher. He is also known as Sascha Alexander.

Born in Hanover, Germany, he was the eldest son of ethnic German refugees from Romania and Hungary. He discovered Teresa Orlowski in 1981. He married her in 1982 in a ceremony in Las Vegas. They divorced in 1989. He then married Sarah Louise Young on 13 January 1991, but they divorced amicably a decade later.

Hans Moser's grandson, Paul Moser, currently works and lives in St  Louis, MO.

Selected filmography
Born for Love (1987)  - a German-American co-production featuring Sibylle Rauch, John Leslie, Karin Schubert, Joey Silvera, Elle Rio, Jamie Summers, Tom Byron, Sharon Kane and others.
Foxy Lady 01-12 (1984–1986) - he made these movies with Teresa Orlowski, the first German porn star.

References

External links
  Note: Without his movies with Teresa Orlowski.

1944 births
2016 deaths
Photographers from Lower Saxony
German pornographic film producers
German pornographic film directors
Film people from Hanover